Albert Hamilton Gordon (July 21, 1901 – May 1, 2009), was an American businessman who transformed the Wall Street firm of Kidder Peabody. He bought the firm in 1931 and remained its chairman until selling it to General Electric in 1986. He made cold calls to potential clients well into his 90s and continued to come to his office at Deltec Asset Management several times a week until he was over 100.

During his life, he was well known for his physical fitness.  He made it a habit to walk from downtown New York to Idlewild/JFK Airport, and was also known to walk to hotels rather than take a cab from the airport.  He began running marathons in his 80s, exercised daily until his death, and would regularly play golf, without a golf cart, carrying his own clubs (although he usually made do with only a handful of clubs, rather than an entire bag).  He later attributed his longevity to his dedication to physical fitness

Past 100 years old he continued to serve as the chairman of the Trollope Society and as chairman of the Board of Trustees of the Roxbury Latin School, having graduated from there in 1919 and served as a Trustee since 1940; among his philanthropic activities were generous donations both to the School and to Harvard University. Unknown to many as a bibliophile, Gordon donated the only surviving copy of John Eliot's 1663 “Indian Bible” to  Roxbury Latin School

In his latest years Gordon was still actively involved in investments and was bearish on U.S. stocks prior to the Financial crisis of 2007-2010.
At the time of his death, he was the oldest living alumnus of The Roxbury Latin School, Harvard College and Harvard Business School. He was also a trustee of the New York Road Runners Club.

References

External links
 New York Times article on Albert Gordon's death
 Wall Street Journal article on Albert Gordon's death
 article on Gordon's death from New York Observer
 http://www.nydailynews.com/archives/sports/gordon-goin-article-1.717359 NY Daily News
 Investment Advice from Bloomberg online, 2006

1901 births
2009 deaths
American financiers
American centenarians
Men centenarians
Philanthropists from New York (state)
Harvard Business School alumni
Businesspeople from New York City
People from Scituate, Massachusetts
Harvard College alumni
20th-century American philanthropists
20th-century American businesspeople